Battlefront.com is a video game developer and publisher. Battlefront specialises in war-related games, including turn-based and real-time strategies, as well as simulations of air, land and naval military vehicles.

Apart from publishing the self-developed Combat Mission series, the company publishes games created by other studios (such as 1C Company), including Strategic Command and Theatre of War series.

History
The company began life as Big Time Software when Charles Moylan and Steve Grammont decided to form an independent game company. They produced the successful and unique Combat Mission: Beyond Overlord to critical acclaim in 1999. The fledgling company utilized an online sales model and published a manifesto on its website pledging dedication to its fanbase.

The company continued to grow as subsequent titles in the CM series were released, and other publishers began to partner with BTS. A name change to battlefront.com, coinciding with the domain name of the official website, followed.

List of games published

In development

Cancelled games

Personnel
Matt Faller spent nine years as chief information officer and project manager, leaving the company for employment with Software Generation Ltd. in August 2009. Faller's duties involved design, implementation and support of the battlefront's IT infrastructure and management of customer support.

On July 1, 2010, battlefront hired Phillip Culliton as a "First Second Programmer" after operating for 13 years with a single coder.

Notes and references

External links

 Official website
 "About us" page at the official site
 Battlefront.com profile at MobyGames

Video game companies established in 1997
Video game development companies
Video game publishers